Akpazar is a municipality (belde) in the Mazgirt District, Tunceli Province, Turkey. It had a population of 1,939 in 2021 and is mainly populated by Kurds of different tribal affiliations.

The neighborhoods of Akpazar are Çarşıbaşı, Elmalık, Güneşdere, Güneyharman, Karabulut, Kepektaşı, Kuşçu and Örs.

References 

Towns in Turkey
Kurdish settlements in Tunceli Province
Populated places in Tunceli Province